Kŭmch'ŏn County is a county in the North Hwanghae province of North Korea. It has a population of 68,216.

Geography
Kŭmch'ŏn is bordered to the west by Kaesŏng, to the south by Kaep'ung, to the northwest by T'osan, and to the north by Mt. Pakbong (562 m) and Sin'gye county. It is bordered to the east by the Ryesŏng River, P'yŏngsan, and Pongch'ŏn county (in South Hwanghae). According to preliminary results from the 2008 population census, it has a population of 3,255,388.

Climate
Kŭmch'ŏn had a fairly severe climate, with an average temperature of 10.2 degrees. Inland, the average January temperature is -7 degrees, while the average August temperature is 25.6 degrees. The county receives an average of 1,100 mm of rain per year.

Transportation
The county is served by the P'yongbu line of the Korean State Railway, which stops in at Kŭmch'ŏn station. There is also a highway which runs through Kŭmch'ŏn-ŭp.

Industry 
Agriculture is the main industry of Kŭmch'ŏn. Mainly rice but also several other products like beans, wheat, ginseng and tobacco are cultivated. Kŭmch'ŏn, like many other parts of northern Korea, is a resource-rich region. Some resources are for example asbestos, molybdenum, mercury, cinnabar, serpentine etc.

Administrative divisions
The county is divided into one town (ŭp) and 14 villages (ri).

See also
Geography of North Korea
Administrative divisions of North Korea

References

Counties of North Hwanghae